The International Lenin Peace Prize (mezhdunarodnaya Leninskaya premiya mira) was a Soviet Union award named in honor of Vladimir Lenin. It was awarded by a panel appointed by the Soviet government, to notable individuals whom the panel indicated had "strengthened peace among comrades". It was founded as the International Stalin Prize for Strengthening Peace Among Peoples, but was renamed the International Lenin Prize for Strengthening Peace Among Peoples (Mezhdunarodnaya Leninskaya premiya «Za ukrepleniye mira mezhdu narodami») as a result of de-Stalinization. Unlike the Nobel Prize, the Lenin Peace Prize was usually awarded to several people a year rather than to just one individual. The prize was mainly awarded to prominent Communists and supporters of the Soviet Union who were not Soviet citizens. Notable recipients include W. E. B. Du Bois, Fidel Castro, Lázaro Cárdenas, Salvador Allende, Mikis Theodorakis, Seán MacBride, Angela Davis, Pablo Picasso, Oscar Niemeyer, Faiz Ahmad Faiz, Abdul Sattar Edhi, Funmilayo Ransome-Kuti, CV Raman and Nelson Mandela.

History
The prize was created as the International Stalin Prize for Strengthening Peace Among Peoples on December 21, 1949 by executive order of the Presidium of the Supreme Soviet in honor of Joseph Stalin's seventieth birthday (although this was after his seventy-first).

Following Nikita Khrushchev's denunciation of Stalin in 1956 during the Twentieth Party Congress, the prize was renamed on September 6 as the International Lenin Prize for Strengthening Peace Among Peoples. All previous recipients were asked to return their Stalin Prizes so they could be replaced by the renamed Lenin Prize. By a decision of Presidium of the Supreme Soviet of the USSR of December 11, 1989, the prize was renamed the International Lenin Peace Prize. Two years later, after the collapse of USSR in 1991, the Russian government, as the successor state to the defunct Soviet Union, ended the award program. The Lenin Peace Prize is regarded as a counterpart to the existing Nobel Peace Prize.

The International Lenin Prize should not be confused with the International Peace Prize, awarded by the World Peace Council. In 1941 the Soviet Union created the Stalin Prize (later renamed the USSR State Prize), which was awarded annually to accomplished Soviet writers, composers, artists and scientists.

Stalin Prize recipients

Lenin Prize recipients

See also
Atoms for Peace Award

References

External links

Thoughts on winning the Stalin Peace Prize by Paul Robeson
On Receiving the Stalin Peace Award by Howard Fast
Soviet Prize Medals pictures of the medals and accompanying certificates
  PDF-version of issue of Pravda with ukaz about creation of prize.

 
 
Lists of award winners
Peace awards